May refer to 

Hans Andrias Djurhuus (1883-1951), Faroese poet
Janus Djurhuus (1881-1948), Faroese poet
Rune Djurhuus, Norwegian chess grandmaster
Kristian Djurhuus (1895-1984), Faroese politician
Hákun Djurhuus (1908-1987), Foroese politician
Jens Christian Djurhuus (1773-1853), Faroese poet
Marni Djurhuus, Faroese footballer